Kinetic Securities was an Australian financial services firm that facilitated the trading of shares, equities, derivatives and FX on the Australian Securities Exchange (ASX) & international markets.

Headquartered at 23-25 O'Connell Street in the financial district of Sydney, the firm had developed strong relationships with many leading financial institutions in Australia, New Zealand and the Asia Pacific region.

Despite this, on 1 August 2011 Kinetic Securities entered into voluntary insolvency, and no longer answered phone calls. Notice of this insolvency wasn't communicated to Kinetic's clients.

History
Founded in 2006 by Paul Cheyney and Angus Knight, it was initially established as a boutique advisory firm.

Kinetic Securities had subsequently grown through the addition of experienced analysts and brokers to provide advice across all major asset classes.

Partnerships 
In 2009, Kinetic Securities teamed up with leading accounting and audit firm Searle & Charlton, to offer a Self Managed Superannuation administration service.

References

External links 
 
 KineticSec Australian Securities Commission
 Bloomberg Businessweek
 Firm Qualifies Leads with Online Meetings
 Kinetic Securities Company Profile on ETF Mate

Financial services companies based in Sydney